Eoporis mitonoi is a species of beetle in the family Cerambycidae. It was described by Seki in 1946.

References

Acanthocinini
Beetles described in 1946